Sir George Francis Blacker CBE FRCP FRCS (23 October 1865 – 21 May 1948) was an Irish-born British obstetrician.

Blacker was born in Dublin, the son of Commissary-General Latham William Blacker and Harriette Demaine Blacker (née Smith). He was educated at Cheltenham College and University College, London. He qualified as a doctor in 1890 and in 1891 won the gold medal in the University of London MBBS examination. Two years later he also won the gold medal in the MD examination. He became an obstetrician at University College Hospital. He also lectured on obstetrics and served as dean of the Medical School for several years. He was president of the Radium Institute and was elected a Fellow of the Royal College of Surgeons of England (FRCS) in 1902.

Blacker was commissioned into the Royal Army Medical Corps in 1915 and served in Egypt until 1916, when he resigned his commission. He was appointed Commander of the Order of the British Empire (CBE) in January 1920 for his war work and was knighted in 1923.

Footnotes

References
Obituary, The Times, 25 May 1948
Biography, Who Was Who

1865 births
1948 deaths
British obstetricians
Irish obstetricians
Commanders of the Order of the British Empire
Knights Bachelor
Royal Army Medical Corps officers
British Army personnel of World War I
Medical doctors from Dublin (city)
Alumni of University College London
People educated at Cheltenham College
Fellows of the Royal College of Surgeons